The .450 Rigby is a rifle cartridge designed in 1994 by John Rigby & Co. for the hunting of large, thick-skinned dangerous game animals in Africa. The cartridge is based on the .416 Rigby necked up to accept a .458 in (11.6 mm) bullet and is intended for use in magazine rifles. The cartridge should not be confused with .450 Nitro Express which was introduced by Rigby in 1898, and is a rimmed cartridge intended for use in double rifles.

History
In 1993, Paul Roberts (at that time proprietor of John Rigby & Company) was on an elephant hunt in the Zambezi Valley. Both he and his professional hunter, Joseph Wright, were armed with .416 Rigby rifles. An elephant was found and shot, but due to a misjudgment in the distance, several more rounds were required to finally bring down the elephant.

After this experience, Paul Roberts felt that a cartridge with a greater bullet-weight and a larger caliber, would have been more effective in that situation. Once Paul Roberts returned to the United Kingdom, he necked-up the .416 Rigby case to .458 caliber. The new cartridge fired a .458 in (11.6 mm) bullet weighing 480 gr (31 g) at a velocity of 2378 ft/s (725 m/s) from a 25 in (635 mm) barrel. The new cartridge was named the .450 Rigby in 1994. The cartridge was put into production in 1995. The John Rigby & Co. was building the .416 Rigby rifles on the Magnum Mauser 98 action. Since the .416 Rigby and the .450 Rigby use basically the same case, building rifles for the .450 Rigby was rather simple, requiring only a chamber with a modification made in the collar area and a .458 caliber barrel.

The origins of this .450 Rigby round had been mulling around in Paul Roberts mind for some time before 1993. In 1987 Arthur Chamberlain had had poor experience on buffalo using a bespoke .458 Winchester Magnum with factory ammunition and discussed with Paul Roberts the way to rectify the problem. The .458 Winchester just lacked the velocity to ensure deep penetration but the worst element was that as America does not have an independent Proof House, as in the UK, manufacturers tended to download their ammunition in case pressures were too high and resulted in an accident. Which in America is usually followed by a law suit. The original ballistics of the .458 Winchester were set to match those of the venerable Rigby 470 NE at 2150 ft. But frequently .458 Winchester Magnum commercial ammunition was far slower than this. Paul's suggestion was to revive the old name of the .450 Rigby but in a new design based upon a necked up 416 Rigby case. This was considered and Paul offered to call it the "Rigby 450 AC". and to stamp the cases as such. The downside however was that the much larger diameter of the 416 parent case meant that the magazine would only take 3 cartridges. Arthur Chamberlain wanted a 5 shot box and this was only achievable with a necked up full length .375 Holland & Holland case. So the project was converted into a .458 Lott. He sourced the reamers from USA and Rigby rebuilt the rifle into a Lott. This was proofed in London and was a great success in the field usually requiring only one shot on buffalo. So much so that Paul Roberts then built a .458 Lott for his own personal use. 
At the same time Arthur Chamberlain and Paul designed a London Best Rigby to be chambered in .416 Hoffman. It had a shorter barrel but was supremely accurate. At this time Remington decided to use their own design of case, not based upon Hoffmans necked up .375 Holland & Holland to create what they then called .416 Remington Magnum. The Hoffman case has a slightly larger capacity due to less taper in the throat but was otherwise identical. As  commercial ammunition was going to be made by major manufacturers in .416 Remington Magnum calibre it was suggested by Roberts that the rifle be called a .416 Remington Magnum "chambered for 416 Hoffman cartridge" So it can fire both designations of ammunition. A Remington case fired in this rifle fire forms a new Hoffman case ready for reloading.
This rifle too proved to be both very accurate and effective on a Hunt with Joe Wright in the Zambezi Valley in 1990 on various game including a very big bodied elephant that required only one shot. These two rifles paved the way for the later introduction of the production 450 Rigby rifles mentioned above.

Cartridge dimensions
The .450 Rigby dimensions and specifications are established and ruled by the C.I.P. international organisation, which sets standards for safety testing of firearms.

The .450 Rigby has 8.63 ml (133 gr H2O) cartridge case capacity.

.450 Rigby maximum C.I.P. cartridge dimensions. All sizes in millimeters (mm) and inches (in).

The common rifling twist rate for this cartridge is 420 mm (1 in 16.54 in), 6 grooves, Ø lands = , Ø grooves = , land width = , and the primer type is large rifle.

According to the official C.I.P. rulings the .450 Rigby can handle up to  Pmax piezo pressure. In C.I.P. regulated countries every rifle cartridge combo has to be proofed at 125% of this maximum C.I.P. pressure to certify for sale to consumers. This means that .450 Rigby chambered arms in C.I.P. regulated countries are currently (2022) proof tested at  PE piezo pressure.

Performance
Unlike many of the modern .458 caliber dangerous game cartridges like the .458 Winchester Magnum, .458 Lott, or the .460 Weatherby Magnum, the .450 Rigby was designed to operate at more moderate pressures. At this pressurs, the cartridge easily reaches the intended  with a  bullet. The relatively low pressure limit provides greater operational reliability in hot tropical environments for which the cartridge is intended. Heat can cause higher than Pmax pressures, which can lead to difficulty in extracting a bloated spent cartridge case. In dangerous game hunting scenario's extracting failures can result in injury or possibly a fatality.

Unlike the .458 Winchester Magnum and to a degree the .458 Lott, the .450 Rigby reaches the coveted  velocity mark loaded with a  projectile whilst keeping within the C.I.P. imposed pressure limits. Handloaders can take advantage of the wide range of .458 caliber (11.6 mm) bullets available. The  bullet can reach  whilst staying within the pressure limitation imposed on the cartridge.

The performance level of the .450 Rigby cartridge and other .458 caliber dangerous game cartridges comes at a cost: recoil.

Among commercial sporting cartridges, only the .460 Weatherby Magnum offers a superior performance over the .450 Rigby. However, most bullets manufactured, such as those by Hornady and Woodleigh are rated for .450 Rigby velocities rather than those achievable through the .460 Weatherby. For this reason actual practical performance and penetration on heavy, thick-skinned game species are on par between these two cartridges. The Weatherby cartridge has a 6% greater case capacity than the .450 Rigby and operates at higher pressures and recoil is even more severe.

Sporting Use
The .450 Rigby was designed primarily to take heavy, thick-skinned dangerous game animals in Africa. Due to the cartridge's performance, it would be considered a better cartridge for these game species such as African elephant, Cape buffalo, rhinoceros and perhaps hippopotamus than the usual standby cartridges used on these game such as the .458 Winchester Magnum, or even the .458 Lott cartridges especially if one were to use handloaded ammunition. When hunting these game species a bullet of a tough construction is required especially at the velocities the .450 Rigby is capable of attaining. It is important to tailor the performance to the velocity rating of the bullet with regard to this cartridge as it provides a step up in performance over the cartridges the .458 caliber (11.6 mm) bullets are manufactured for. This is especially true for soft-nosed bullets as they can open up too rapidly at velocities the .450 Rigby can attain. When hunting these game species only bullets weighing  of a tougher construction should be used.

.450 Dakota
The .450 Dakota is a variation on the design of the .450 Rigby but predates the latter cartridge by a few years. The Dakota cartridge was designed by Don Allen and is like the .450 Rigby based on the .416 Rigby case necked up to accept a .458 caliber (11.6 mm) bullet. The .450 Dakota is considered a proprietary cartridge, the rights to which are owned by Dakota Arms Inc., Remington Arms Company and the Freedom Group family of companies. Neither the CIP nor SAAMI regulate nor have oversight over this cartridge. While dimensions of the cartridges are similar they are not identical and are not interchangeable due to the shoulder dimensions and the case length. The performance of both cartridges are almost identical.

 Schematic of the .450 Dakota. All dimensions in inches [millimeters].

While these velocity values are greater than that of the .450 Rigby cartridge, the Dakota ammunition is loaded to near maximum pressure levels while the .450 Rigby is loaded to a pressure level far below the  stipulated by the CIP. Given equal pressure level the .450 Rigby will turn out a similar performance level as the .450 Dakota cartridge; this is evident through third-party reloading data provided for the .450 Rigby. Any differences between these cartridges are strictly due to the components use and the pressure levels than due to an actual difference between the cartridges.

References

Pistol and rifle cartridges
Wildcat cartridges
British firearm cartridges
John Rigby & Co cartridges